Telphusa tetragrapta is a moth of the family Gelechiidae. It is found in India.

The larvae have been recorded feeding on Quercus incana.

References

Moths described in 1937
Telphusa
Taxa named by Edward Meyrick